Ganryu Island is an collaborative album by John Zorn and Michihiro Sato. The album was first released on vinyl LP on Yukon Records in 1984 and later re-released on Tzadik Records as a CD with five additional tracks in 1998.

The album is titled after Ganryujima, a small island in the Strait of Shimonoseki where legendary samurai warriors Miyamoto Musashi and Sasaki Kojiro engaged in battle.

Reception
The Allmusic review by Joslyn Layne awarded the album 4 stars stating "The great, no-holds-barred improvisation is by no means an inchoate whirl -- indeed, the shamisen's rhythmic presence often provides a steady, but flexible structure for the duo's truly imaginative interaction".

The Penguin Guide to Jazz observed "listening to Ganryu Island is like panning for gold: seeming eternities spent lodging through muddy dross in order to turn up a few moments of pure gold. By the oddest perversity, the very best tracks seem to be those which were excluded from the venial release".

Track listing
All compositions by John Zorn and Satoh Michihiro

Personnel
John Zorn - alto and soprano saxophones, Bb clarinet, game calls, E-flat clarinet
Sato Michihiro - shamisen

References

John Zorn albums
Tzadik Records albums
albums produced by John Zorn